Theograndin I is a sulfated flavone glucuronide found in Cupuaçu (Theobroma grandiflorum). It is a glucuronide of isoscutellarein (8-Hydroxyapigenin).

References 

Flavone glycosides
Flavonoid glucuronides
Glucuronide esters
Sulfate esters